A Million Vacations is the fourth album by Canadian rock band Max Webster. The record was released in 1979 in Canada by Anthem Records and in the United States and Europe by Capitol Records.  The hit songs "A Million Vacations", "Let Go the Line", and "Paradise Skies" remain as Canadian Classic rock radio station staples. The lead track "Paradise Skies" was released by Capitol-EMI Records Britain as a picture disc single that featured "The Party" from their previous album Mutiny Up My Sleeve. 

The album was certified platinum by the Canadian Recording Industry Association.

Track listing 
Side one
"Paradise Skies" (Kim Mitchell, Pye Dubois) – 3:15
"Charmonium" (Terry Watkinson) – 4:15
"Night Flights" (Watkinson, Dubois) – 3:02
"Sun Voices" (Mitchell, Dubois) – 4:50
"Moon Voices" (Mitchell) – 3:05

Side two
"A Million Vacations" (Gary McCracken, Dubois) – 3:10
"Look Out" (Mitchell, Dubois) – 4:53
"Let Go the Line" (Watkinson) – 3:25
"Rascal Houdi" (Mitchell, Dubois) – 3:28
"Research (At Beach Resorts)" (Mitchell, Dubois) – 4:45

Personnel
Max Webster
Kim Mitchell – guitars and vocals
Terry Watkinson – keyboards and vocals, lead vocals on "Charmonium" and "Let Go the Line"
Dave Myles – bass guitar
Gary McCracken – drums and percussion, lead vocals on "A Million Vacations"
Pye Dubois – lyrics

Additional musicians
Carla Jensen, Judy Donnelly – additional vocals
Dick Smith – congas, shaker
Bill Misener – string arrangements

Production
John de Nottbeck – producer
Mark Wright – engineer
David Greene – mixing at Soundstage, Toronto
Bob Ludwig – mastering at Masterdisk, New York

Charts

References

1979 albums
Max Webster albums
Anthem Records albums
Capitol Records albums